Chaudhry Muhammad Munir Azhar (born 1 October 1941) is a Pakistani politician who had been a member of the National Assembly of Pakistan, from June 2013 to May 2018.

Early life
He was born on 1 October 1941.

Political career
He ran for the seat of the Provincial Assembly of the Punjab as a candidate of Pakistan Muslim League (Q) (PML-Q) from Constituency PP-225 (Sahiwal-VI) in 2002 Pakistani general election but was unsuccessful. He received 32,244 votes and lost the seat to Chaudhry Muhammad Arshad Jutt.

He ran for the seat of the National Assembly of Pakistan as a candidate of Pakistan Muslim League (N) (PML-N) from Constituency NA-163 (Sahiwal-IV) in 2008 Pakistani general election but was unsuccessful. He received 34,644 votes and lost to Malik Nauman Ahmad Langrial, a candidate of PML-Q.

He was elected to the National Assembly as a candidate of PML-N from Constituency NA-163 (Sahiwal-IV) in 2013 Pakistani general election. He received 89,126 votes and defeated Malik Nauman Ahmad Langrial, a candidate of PML-Q.

References

Living people
Pakistan Muslim League (N) politicians
Punjabi people
Pakistani MNAs 2013–2018
Politicians from Sahiwal
1941 births